Ernie Smith was an American football coach.  He was the eighth head football coach at Adams State College—now known as Adams State University—in Alamosa, Colorado and he held that position for two seasons, from 1957 until 1958. His coaching record at Adams State was 11–17–1.

References

Year of birth missing
Possibly living people
Adams State Grizzlies football coaches